So You Think You Can Dance (SYTYCD) is an American reality television dance competition show that airs on Fox in the United States and is the flagship series of the international So You Think You Can Dance television franchise. It was created by American Idol producers Simon Fuller and Nigel Lythgoe and is produced by 19 Entertainment and Dick Clark Productions The series premiered on July 20, 2005, with over ten million viewers and ended the summer season as the top-rated show on television. The first season was hosted by American news personality Lauren Sánchez. Since the second season, it has been hosted by English former children's television personality and game show emcee Cat Deeley.

The show features a format where dancers trained in a variety of dance genres enter open auditions held in a number of major U.S. cities to showcase their talents and move forward through successive additional rounds of auditions to test their ability to adapt to different styles. At the end of this process, a small number of dancers are chosen as finalists. These dancers move on to the competition's main phase, where they perform solo, duet, and group dance numbers on live television, attempting to master a diverse selection of dance styles, including classical, contemporary, ballroom, hip-hop, street, club, jazz and musical theatre styles, among others. They compete for the votes of the broadcast viewing audience which, combined with the input of a panel of judges, determines which dancers advance to the next stage from week to week, until a winner is crowned as "America's favorite dancer".

So You Think You Can Dance has won seven Primetime Emmy Awards for Outstanding Choreography and a total of nine Emmy Awards altogether. Licensed variations of the show, produced for broadcast markets in other nations, began airing in August 2005 and dozens of localized adaptations of the show have been produced since, airing in 41 countries to date. The sixteenth season premiered June 3, 2019. On February 20, 2020, the show was renewed for a seventeenth season, that was set to air in the summer of 2020, but, due to the COVID-19 pandemic in the United States, the season was indefinitely postponed on June 18, 2020. On February 16, 2021, Fox said they would not move forward with producing the seventeenth season in 2021, which left the show's future in doubt. However, in February 2022, it was announced that season 17 would head into production. On April 5, 2022, it was announced that season 17 would premiere on May 18, 2022.

Show format

A typical season of So You Think You Can Dance is divided between a selection process, during which expert judges select competitors from a wide pool of applicant dancers, and a competition phase, during which these 'finalists' (more typically referred to as the 'Top 20') compete for votes from home viewers. Although it is produced over the course of months, the selection phase is highly edited and usually constitutes only the first 2 to 4 weeks of aired episodes with the competition episodes forming the remaining 7 to 9 weeks of the season.

Open auditions
The open auditions, the first stage in determining a season's finalists, take place in 2 to 6 major U.S. cities each season and are typically open to anyone aged 18 to 30 at the time of their audition, although season 13 focused on a younger class of competitors, ages 8 to 14. The cities where auditions are held change from season to season but some, such as Los Angeles and New York City, have featured in most seasons. During this stage, the dancers perform a brief routine (typically a solo, but duet and group routines are allowed as well) before a panel of dance experts usually headed by series creator and executive producer Nigel Lythgoe. This panel then decides on-the-spot whether the dancer demonstrated enough ability and performance value to proceed further. If the dancer exhibited exceptional ability in their performance, judges award "a ticket to Vegas" (or in more recent seasons "a ticket to the Academy"), moving them instantly one step forward in the competition. Alternatively, if judges are on the fence about the dancer, they may ask the contestant to wait until the end of that day's auditions to participate in a short test of their ability to pick up professional choreography.

Callbacks
The second stage of the selection process is referred to as "the callbacks" (this round was referenced as "Vegas Week" for much of the show's run, as it was held in Las Vegas, but has been called Academy Week since season 13). The callbacks consist of a several-day-long process in which the remaining hopefuls are tested for overall well-rounded dance ability, stamina, creativity and their ability to perform under pressure. The dancers are put through a battery of rounds that test their ability to pick up various dance styles; these are typically some of the more well-represented genres that are later prominent in the competition phase, such as hip-hop, jazz, ballroom, and contemporary. Additionally the dancers may be asked to perform further solos in styles of their choosing and participate in a group choreography round in which small teams of contestants must display their musicality and ability to communicate professionally by choreographing a performance to a randomly selected piece of music — this challenge is notable as being the only time competitors are asked to choreograph themselves, aside from solos.

The callbacks are often collectively portrayed as one of the most exhausting and stressful stages of the competition; each successive round sees cuts in which a significant portion of the remaining dancers are eliminated from competition and are given a limited amount of time to adapt to styles they are sometimes wholly unfamiliar with while being physically taxed by the rapid progression of rounds and a limited amount of rest. At the end of this process, usually less than 40 competitors remain in a pool that final contestants are chosen from. Most seasons have featured 20 "top" finalists for the competition portion of the show, but season 1 was represented by a Top 16, season 7 saw a Top 11 and seasons 13 through 15 have featured a Top 10.

Finalist stage
Following the finalist selection process, the show transitions into its regular competition phase, which lasts for the rest of the season. The competition stage is typically divided into eight weeks, generally with two contestants eliminated per week. Dancers are paired up into male-female couples that will sometimes stay paired for much of the remaining competition if neither is eliminated (since season 7, competitors have also been occasionally paired with "All Stars", returning dancers from previous seasons who partner with the contestant dancers, but who are not themselves competing). These couples perform 1 or 2 duets per week in different styles which are typically, but not always, randomly selected. These duets, as with all non-solo performances at this stage in the competition, are choreographed by professional choreographers. Prior to most duet performances, a video packet of clips of the couple preparing to perform the routine is shown. These packets are intended not only to demonstrate the couple's efforts to master the routine, but also to give glimpses of the personalities and personal histories of the dancers, as well as insights from the choreographer as to the thematic, narrative and artistic intentions of the piece. Following each duet performance, the week's panel of judges gives critical feedback, often emphasizing the two key areas of technique and performance value. Duets and their accompanying video packets and critiques typically take up the majority of an episode but are often supplemented by solos, group numbers, and occasionally guest dance or musical performances.

 
In season 1, each week of the competition featured a single episode, with dancers' eliminations pre-recorded the week they occurred and then broadcast at the beginning of the next week's episode. In seasons 2 to 8, the show's weekly format was split between two episodes, a performance episode, as described above, and a results show which revealed the outcome of the at-home-viewer voting following the performance show of the same week. More recent seasons have returned to a one-show-per-week format, but with each week's episode typically reflecting the results of voting for the previous week's performances, with these results revealed at the end of the following week's performances. Depending on the stage of the competition, each week may feature eliminations which are based entirely on an at-home viewer vote, or the vote may simply create a group of bottom dancers from which the show's judges will select the final eliminations. Voting has also varied by season (and often within seasons) with regard to whether the voter selected individuals or couples. Following the announcement of their elimination, dancers are typically given a brief send-off via a video montage. Each competitive episode ends with a quick recap of the night's routines accompanied by voting prompts. Episodes typically last around two hours, commercials included. There has also been variability in how long couples are kept together and how the at-home-viewer votes are balanced against judge decisions, though ultimately at some point in every season, the judges give up their power to save dancers and eliminations are determined exclusively by viewer votes. The total number of hours shown in a given week during the performance phase of the competition has varied from two to four hours.

The finale episode is often the most elaborately produced show of a season and features the last performances of the competitors, encore performances of many of the season's most acclaimed routines, guest dancers (including returning past season competitors and cast members from other international versions of the franchise), musical performances, and multiple video packets chronicling the course of the season's events, all culminating in the announcement of the winner of the competition. Most seasons have featured a single winner, while seasons 9 and 10 featured both a male and female winner. Following the closure of the season, the Top Ten dancers often go on tour for several months, performing hit routines from the season among other performances.

Judges

A typical season of So You Think You Can Dance is presided over by a panel of 2 to 4 permanent judges, supplemented by occasional guest judges, with the panel sometimes ballooning up to twice or more its normal size for callback episodes or season finales. Executive producer and co-creator of the show Nigel Lythgoe is the only judge to have sat as a permanent member of the panel across all seasons except Season 17, although ballroom specialist Mary Murphy has also sat as a permanent member of the panel for the majority of seasons. Other permanent judges have included film director and choreographer Adam Shankman, contemporary choreographer Mia Michaels, pop music and dance icon Paula Abdul, noted youth dancer Maddie Ziegler, actress and singer Vanessa Hudgens, music and dance artist Jason Derulo, choreographer and TV personality Laurieann Gibson, actress, dancer and singer JoJo Siwa, actor and singer Matthew Morrison and successful show alumni Stephen "tWitch" Boss and Dominic "D-Trix" Sandoval.

Many earlier seasons frequently featured guest judges in occasional episodes, although this practice has become increasingly rare. These guest judge positions have typically been filled by choreographers who regularly work on the show (who in rare cases may also be former contestants themselves) as well as by iconic names from the entertainment industry. Guest judges for the show have included: Debbie Allen, Christina Applegate, Robin Antin, Toni Basil, Cicely Bradley, Kristin Chenoweth, Misty Copeland, Alex Da Silva, Ellen DeGeneres, Tyce Diorio, Joey Dowling, Napoleon and Tabitha D'umo, Carmen Electra, Brian Friedman, Jean-Marc Généreux, Jason Gilkison, Neil Patrick Harris, Hi-Hat, Katie Holmes, Dan Karaty, Lady Gaga, Carly Rae Jepsen, Lil' C, Rob Marshall, Mandy Moore, Megan Mullally, Kenny Ortega, Toni Redpath, Debbie Reynolds, Wade Robson, Doriana Sanchez, Shane Sparks, Sonya Tayeh, Olisa Thompson, Stacey Tookey, Jesse Tyler Ferguson and Travis Wall.

Overview of format and presentation by season

Dance styles and choreographers

Over the course of its seventeen seasons, So You Think You Can Dance has featured dozens of distinct dance styles in its choreographed routines. Most of these styles fall into four categories that are regularly showcased and can be found in almost every performance episode: western contemporary/classical styles, ballroom styles, hip-hop/street styles as well as Jazz and its related styles. Various other forms of dance that do not especially fall into these broad categories are seen as well, but not as regularly. The following styles have all been seen in a choreographed duet or group routine; styles featured only in auditions or solos are not listed.

Classical styles

Routines from the classically derived style of contemporary dance are the most common dances seen on the show, being seen in every performance episode of the series (and typically at least twice per episode). While contemporary, lyrical, and modern dance are typically considered three separate (if overlapping) styles of dance, the practice on So You Think You Can Dance has been to refer to all routines in this area as "contemporary", except in the first season where the label "lyrical" was used for the same purpose. Ballet routines occur much more rarely, at a rate of one or two per season, since their introduction in the fourth season.

Street and club styles
Hip-hop routines are also present in every performance episode. While these routines frequently feature elements from many different subgenres of hip-hop (locking and popping, for example) and various "street" styles (such as breaking), they are typically all labelled under the umbrella term of hip-hop. An exception is the now frequently featured lyrical hip-hop, which is unique amongst all styles on SYTYCD in that it is the only one that is held to have become a known distinct style at least in-part as a result of the show; the style is widely attributed to regular show choreographers Tabitha and Napoleon D'umo and the term itself to judge Adam Shankman. These two broad categories are occasionally supplemented by routines which are labelled as krump, breakdancing, waacking and stepping.

Ballroom styles 
Ballroom styles are also seen regularly in every performance episode. These routines may use the movement of traditional International Standard forms or lean toward American competitive styles. Other routines may use street or regional variants or may combine elements of different variations.

Jazz, Broadway and musical theater styles

Jazz is featured in nearly all performance episodes. While these routines are typically labelled simply "Jazz", the genre is notable as being one of the most fusional featured on the show and various style combinations and sub-categories have been referenced. Descended from Jazz but treated as a separate genre on SYTYCD, "Broadway" is analogous to the label "Musical Theater" outside the U.S.

American social styles

These dance styles are featured less frequently than their ballroom relatives, but have been seen intermittently since the first season.

Regional/traditional styles

In addition to the broad categories above, many more styles that are less common in the U.S. are sometimes featured. Most of these are seen only once, but the Bollywood style has been featured several times per season since the fourth season.

Grand finalists

Special shows
On September 2, 2009, as a prelude to season 6, a special show aired featuring judge picks for the top 15 routines from the first five seasons. At the end of the show, show creator and judge Nigel Lythgoe presented his favorite performance, a contemporary piece choreographed by Tyce Diorio and performed by Melissa Sandvig and Ade Obayomi.

In March 2014, Chinese television station CCTV broadcast a promotional episode in which notable all-star dancers from the U.S. and Chinese versions of So You Think You Can Dance competed directly against one another as teams. Titled Zhōngměi Wǔ Lín Guànjūn Duìkàngsài - Super Dancer Born Tonight, the show was shot in Las Vegas but never aired on U.S. television.

Ratings
So You Think You Can Dance premiered with over 10 million viewers in 2005. For season 1, it was the No. 1 summer show on television. However, when NBC's America's Got Talent premiered in the summer of 2006, it took the title of "#1 summer show" and, over the following few years, broadened its lead. In summer 2009, SYTYCD premiered strong with a 3.4 rating in its target demographic, although with the start of America's Got Talent roughly a month later in the same timeslot, Dance fell to No. 4 on the ratings board. It continued to lose viewers throughout the summer of 2009 and ended up with an average of approximately 8 million viewers. Fox then moved SYTYCD to its fall 2009 schedule where its ratings continued to decline; hitting an all-time series low of 4.6 million viewers for a "special" episode hosted by Nigel Lythgoe on September 2, 2009. The move to the fall was short-lived. After dropping to an average of 6 million viewers, Fox moved SYTYCD back to the summer in 2010. With Mia Michaels replacing Mary Murphy and former contestants termed as "All-Stars" being used as partners, the ratings for Dance continued to slide to all-time series lows; dropping to just 5.6 million viewers on July 15, 2010. For season 7, So You Think You Can Dance averaged just over 5 million viewers. After season 7, Mia Michaels was replaced on the judge's panel by returning personality Mary Murphy. The change appeared to have little effect on the ratings, and the show continued to average just over five million viewers per episode in 2011's season 8. Season 9 saw a slight uptick in ratings early on, with each of the season's first five episodes garnering between six and seven million viewers, but the rise was short-lived and the show's ratings hit a new low of 4.16 million viewers on August 29, 2012. Season 10 maintained similar numbers, averaging about 4 million viewers per episode in 2013, with a 4.3 million viewership for the last episode of the season, an all-time series low for a finale.

In April 2014, Lythgoe appealed to fans on Twitter to share information about the show ahead of the 11th season's May premiere in an attempt to augment the show's ratings for the upcoming season and bolster its chances of renewal thereafter. The show was renewed for a 12th season, but ratings continued to decline, with an average of around 3.5 million viewers per show. FOX renewed the show for a 13th season, but with a drastically re-worked format focused on child dancers. Ratings declined further for the new version, with only five episodes breaking the 3 million viewer mark; the finale saw a series low viewership of just 2.27 million viewers.

In 2016, a New York Times study of the 50 TV shows with the most Facebook Likes found that "in general", Dance "is more popular in cities, though it hits peak popularity in Utah".

Influence and international franchise
Dance competition had been a part of American television for decades before the premiere of So You Think You Can Dance, but usually in the form of all-around talent searches (such as Star Search, Soul Train, or Showtime at the Apollo). However, a season-long American Idol-like talent-search show with a sole focus on dance had never been broadcast on American network television. Producers and judges associated with the show have stated on numerous occasions, both within broadcasts of the show and in interviews, that the series was meant to rejuvenate the visibility and appreciation of dance as an art form in the U.S. and to give exposure to struggling dancers. Series judge Mary Murphy says, for example, "Of course you hope you can make a living at it, because you don't want to give up on something that you do, but the honest truth is most dancers have to carry one or two jobs and dance as much as they can on the side -- it's a very lucky dancer who gets a full scholarship."<ref>{{cite web|url=https://www.youtube.com/watch?v=IrbNyuZCdbk&feature=player_embedded | archive-url=https://ghostarchive.org/varchive/youtube/20211117/IrbNyuZCdbk| archive-date=2021-11-17 | url-status=live|title=L.A. Music Examiner - Catching Up With Mary Murphy at the So You Think You Can Dance L.A. Auditions |publisher=Youtube.com |access-date=2013-10-20}}</ref> A number of dance-themed competition shows have been produced for American television since the premiere of So You Think You Can Dance, including America's Best Dance Crew, Superstars of Dance, Live to Dance, and World of Dance.

In 2009, Lythgoe came together with fellow SYTYCD judge Adam Shankman as well as Katie Holmes, Carrie Ann Inaba and others in the dance entertainment industry in an effort to launch The Dizzyfeet Foundation, with the aim of providing scholarships and training to young dancers of limited means. The foundation has been referenced sporadically on the show since. In 2010, Lythgoe, with the assistance of other SYTYCD personalities and long-time healthy lifestyles proponent Congresswoman Eleanor Holmes Norton, was successful in getting another of his dance-oriented concepts realized—an official National Dance Day, now held annually on the last Saturday of July, to promote fitness through movement. This national dance day has been celebrated annually by the show since.

Before the end of 2005, the year that the series first premiered, its format had already been licensed for the first of a number foreign adaptations. To date, the resulting So You Think You Can Dance franchise has produced 28 shows representing 39 countries and comprising more than 90 individual seasons. These adaptations have aired in Armenia, Australia, Belgium, Canada, China, Denmark, Egypt, Finland, France, Georgia, Germany, Greece, Iraq, India, Israel, Jordan, Kazakhstan, Kuwait, Lebanon, Lithuania, Malaysia, Morocco, the Netherlands, New Zealand, Norway, Palestinian Territories, Poland, Portugal, Qatar, Russia, South Africa, Sudan, Sweden, Syria, Tunisia, Turkey, Ukraine, United Arab Emirates, the United Kingdom and Vietnam.

Awards and nominations
As of 2017, nine former SYTYCD contestants have been nominated for the Primetime Emmy Award for Outstanding Choreography. Five were nominated for their work on Dancing with the Stars: Chelsie Hightower in 2010, Travis Wall and Nick Lazzarini in 2012 (with Teddy Forance), Alison Holker in 2013 (with Derek Hough) and Witney Carson in 2015. Hokuto Konishi, Ryan “Ryanimay” Conferido, and Dominic “D-Trix” Sandoval were nominated in 2016 as part of the B-boy troupe Quest Crew for their work on America's Best Dance Crew. Dmitry Chaplin in 2009 and Travis Wall in 2011, 2013, 2014, 2015, 2016 and 2017 were nominated for their work on SYTYCD itself. The only former contestants to have won the Choreography Emmy are Konishi, Conferido, and Sandoval in 2016 and Wall in 2015 and 2017.

Emmy Awards

Teen Choice Awards

See also
 So You Think You Can Dance franchise index and overview
 List of So You Think You Can Dance finalists Dance on television (list of shows)

Similar dance competition TV shows:
 America's Best Dance Crew Live to Dance/Got to Dance Superstars of Dance World of Dance''

Notes

References

External links

 
 

 
Fox Broadcasting Company original programming
2005 American television series debuts
2000s American reality television series
2010s American reality television series
2020s American reality television series
English-language television shows
Television series by Dick Clark Productions